Eresiomera campbelli is a butterfly in the family Lycaenidae. It is found in Cameroon, the Republic of the Congo and the Democratic Republic of the Congo.

Adults have been recorded in February.

References

Butterflies described in 1998
Poritiinae